The Arrow Coax Livella Uno is a German helicopter under development by Arrow Coax Ultra Light Helicopter of Hornhausen and introduced at the AERO Friedrichshafen airshow in 2015. The aircraft is intended to be supplied as a kit for amateur construction.

Design and development
The Livella Uno was designed to comply with the US FAR 103 Ultralight Vehicles and the European 120 kg class ultralight aircraft rules. It features a dual coaxial main rotors, with an inverted V-tail, a single open-air pilot's seat without a windshield, tricycle landing gear and a  Wankel Aixro XH40 engine.

The aircraft fuselage is made from tubing.

The aircraft mounts a Galaxy Rescue System ballistic parachute in the rotor mast. It also has a small electric motor to power the rotor system from a battery in the event of an engine failure, allowing five minutes of power to land, since the low inertia rotor blades may not support autorotation.

Specifications (Livella Uno)

See also
List of rotorcraft

References

External links
Photo of the Livella Uno prototype

Livella Uno
2010s German sport aircraft
2010s German ultralight aircraft
2010s German helicopters
Homebuilt aircraft
Wankel-engined helicopters
Rotary-engined aircraft
Coaxial rotor helicopters